The list below shows the leading sire of broodmares in Great Britain and Ireland for each year since 1899. This is determined by the amount of prize money won during the year in Great Britain and Ireland by racehorses that were foaled by a daughter of the sire in question.

 1899 - Galopin (1)
 1900 - Hampton (1)
 1901 - Bend Or (1)
 1902 - Bend Or (2)
 1903 - St. Simon (1)
 1904 - St. Simon (2)
 1905 - St. Simon (3)
 1906 - St. Simon (4)
 1907 - St. Simon (5)
 1908 - Gallinule (1)
 1909 - Galopin (2)
 1910 - Galopin (3)
 1911 - Gallinule (2)
 1912 - Isinglass (1)
 1913 - Gallinule (3)
 1914 - Persimmon (1)
 1915 - Persimmon (2)
 1916 - St. Simon (6)
 1917 - Beppo (1)
 1918 - Gallinule (4)
 1919 - Persimmon (3)
 1920 - Gallinule (5)
 1921 - Cyllene (1)
 1922 - William the Third (1)
 1923 - Sundridge (1)
 1924 - St. Frusquin (1)
 1925 - Bayardo (1)
 1926 - Tredennis (1)
 1927 - Chaucer (1)
 1928 - Farasi (1)
 1929 - Farasi (2)
 1930 - Sunstar (1)
 1931 - Gainsborough (1)
 1932 - Swynford (1)
 1933 - Chaucer (2)
 1934 - By George (1)
 1935 - Friar Marcus (1)
 1936 - Buchan (1)
 1937 - Phalaris (1)
 1938 - Hurry On (1)
 1939 - Stefan the Great (1)
 1940 - Buchan (2)

 1941 - Phalaris (2)
 1942 - Phalaris (3)
 1943 - Solario (1)
 1944 - Hurry On (2)
 1945 - Hurry On (3)
 1946 - Fairway (1)
 1947 - Fairway (2)
 1948 - Hyperion (1)
 1949 - Solario (2)
 1950 - Solario (3)
 1951 - Fair Trial (1)
 1952 - Nearco (1)
 1953 - Donatello II (1)
 1954 - Blue Peter (1)
 1955 - Nearco (2)
 1956 - Nearco (3)
 1957 - Hyperion (2)
 1958 - Mieuxce (1)
 1959 - Bois Roussel (1)
 1960 - Bois Roussel (2)
 1961 - Big Game (1)
 1962 - Big Game (2)
 1963 - Ambiorix (1)
 1964 - Arctic Prince (1)
 1965 - Tom Fool (1)
 1966 - Big Game (3)
 1967 - Hyperion (3)
 1968 - Hyperion (4)
 1969 - Arctic Prince (2)
 1970 - Bull Page (1)
 1971 - Princequillo (1)
 1972 - Prince Chevalier (1)
 1973 - Honeys Alibi (1)
 1974 - Crepello (1)
 1975 - Worden (1)
 1976 - Worden (2)
 1977 - Victoria Park (1)
 1978 - Hardicanute (1)
 1979 - Hornbeam (1)
 1980 - High Hat (1)
 1981 - Val de Loir (1)
 1982 - Vaguely Noble (1)

 1983 - Sir Ivor (1)
 1984 - Bold Reason (1)
 1985 - Graustark (1)
 1986 - Thatch (1)
 1987 - Habitat (1)
 1988 - Blushing Groom (1)
 1989 - Bustino (1)
 1990 - High Top (1)
 1991 - Master Derby (1)
 1992 - Northfields (1)
 1993 - High Top (2)
 1994 - Habitat (2)
 1995 - Blushing Groom (2)
 1996 - Habitat (3)
 1997 - Nureyev (1)
 1998 - High Line (1)
 1999 - Miswaki (1)
 2000 - Rahy (1)
 2001 - Miswaki (2)
 2002 - Darshaan (1)
 2003 - Rainbow Quest (1)
 2004 - Rainbow Quest (2)
 2005 - Sadler's Wells (1)
 2006 - Sadler's Wells (2)
 2007 - Sadler's Wells (3)
 2008 - Sadler's Wells (4)
 2009 - Sadler's Wells (5)
 2010 - Sadler's Wells (6)
 2011 - Sadler's Wells (7)
 2012 - Danehill (1)
 2013 - Darshaan (2)
 2014 - Danehill (2)
 2015 - Danehill (3)
 2016 - Danehill Dancer (1)
 2017 - Pivotal (1)
 2018 - Pivotal (2)
 2019 - Pivotal (3)
 2020 - Galileo (1)
 2021 - Galileo (2)
 2022 - Galileo (3)

References

 tbheritage.com
 Racing Post (1988 to 2015)

See also
 Leading sire in Australia
 Leading sire in France
 Leading sire in Germany
 Leading sire in Great Britain & Ireland
 Leading sire in Japan
 Leading broodmare sire in Japan
 Leading sire in North America
 Leading broodmare sire in North America

Horse racing in Great Britain
Horse racing in Ireland